The X Factor is a television music competition franchise.

X Factor or The X Factor may also refer to:

National versions of the franchise
 The X Factor (British TV series)
 The X Factor (U.S. TV series)
 The X Factor (Australian TV series)
 The X Factor (Greek TV series)
 The X Factor (New Zealand TV series)
 The X Factor Philippines
 The X Factor (Arabic TV series)
 Factor X (Chilean TV series)
 The X Factor: Ji Qing Chang Xiang, Chinese version
 The X Factor: Zhongguo Zui Qiang Yin, Chinese version
 Faktor A, Russian version
 El Factor X, Colombian version
 Factor X (Spanish TV series)
 Factor X (Portuguese TV series)
 X-Factor (Armenian TV series)
 X Factor (Belgian TV series)
 X Factor (Brazilian TV series)
 X Factor (Bulgarian TV series)
 X Factor (Czech TV series)
 X Factor (Danish TV series)
 X Factor (Finnish TV series)
 X Factor (French TV series)
 X Factor (German TV series)
 X Factor (Icelandic TV series)
 X Factor India
 X Faktor (Hungarian TV series)
 X Factor Indonesia
 The X Factor Israel
 X Factor (Italian TV series)
 X Factor (Kazakh TV series)
 X Faktorius
 X Factor (Dutch TV series)
 X Factor (Norwegian TV series)
 X Factor (Polish TV series)
 X Factor (Romanian TV series)
 X Factor (Slovenian TV series)
 X Factor Slovakia
 X Factor (Swedish TV series)
 X-Factor (Ukrainian TV series)

Sports
Dante Hall (born 1978) (nicknamed "The X-factor"), American football player
X-Factor (professional wrestling), a wrestling stable in the World Wrestling Federation (WWF)
The X-Factor, or Sitout facebuster, a professional wrestling move

Music
The X Factor (album), by Iron Maiden

Games and comics
The X Factor, a 2010 video game published by Deep Silver
X-Factor (comics), an American comic book series published by Marvel Comics

Other uses
The X Factor, a science fiction book by Andre Norton
X-factor (astrophysics), the proportionality constant which converts CO emission line brightness to molecular hydrogen mass
X-factor, an abnormally large heart seen in some Thoroughbred horses
"Ex-Factor", a 1998 song by Lauryn Hill
The common use of the letter x as a variable (mathematics)

See also
Factor X (disambiguation)
The Ex-Factor (disambiguation)

ga:The X Factor
hu:The X Factor (egyértelműsítő lap)